Nantyglo and Blaina is a community in Blaenau Gwent, South Wales, including the small towns of Blaina and Nantyglo.
The population in 2011 was 9,443.

Freedom of the Town
The following people and military units have received the Freedom of the Town of Nantyglo and Blaina.

Individuals
 Michael Ruddock : 10 September 2004.

Military Units

References

Communities in Blaenau Gwent